Fraunhofera is a genus of flowering plants in the family Celastraceae. It has only one species, Fraunhofera multiflora, called pau branco, which is a Brazilian endemic. Found in deciduous forests of Brazil, they are little-studied shrubs or trees, and only immature fruit have ever been observed.

References

Celastraceae
Celastrales genera
Monotypic rosid genera
Plants described in 1831
Flora of Northeast Brazil
Endemic flora of Brazil